Philip Alexander Bruce (March 7, 1856 – August 16, 1933) was an American historian who specialized in the history of the Commonwealth of Virginia. Author of over a dozen volumes of history, Bruce's scope ranged from the first Virginia settlements to the early 20th century. He is known for writing the first complete history of the University of Virginia, descriptions of the lives of the original settlers of Virginia, and for his insights into Thomas Jefferson's wide-ranging intellect.

Personal life 
Bruce was born into a plantation family in Charlotte County, Virginia; his younger brother was William Cabell Bruce, later a US Senator from Maryland. Philip studied literature and history at the University of Virginia, graduating in 1876; he went on to get an LL.B. from Harvard University in 1879. He married Elizabeth Tunstall Taylor Newton on October 19, 1896, and together had one child, a daughter.

Bruce died at home in Charlottesville, Virginia on August 16, 1933 and was interred at the University of Virginia Cemetery.

Career 
Bruce began a long career as a published historian in 1889 with the publication of The Plantation Negro as a Freeman. His most notable research came with a series of three works on seventeenth century Virginia, covering the economic, social, and institutional frameworks of the first Virginia settlers, published between 1896 and 1910.

Bruce was the corresponding secretary of the Virginia Historical Society. He was awarded honorary doctorates by both The College of William and Mary and Washington and Lee University.

In the last decade of his life, Bruce authored a five-volume history of the first hundred years of the University of Virginia, which is credited for expanding the historical perspective on the talents of Thomas Jefferson, and co-authored a five-volume history of the Commonwealth of Virginia. He died after a long illness at his home near Charlottesville. He is remembered for attempts to raise the consciousness of Northern readers to Virginia’s contributions to the history of the United States through a series of letters to the New York Times on such topics as the claim of Virginia's House of Burgesses as the second elected legislature after the British Parliament and the importance of Jamestown as the first permanent English settlement in the Americas.

Published works

See also
 Charles Henry Ambler – another preeminent historian of Virginia and West Virginia history in Bruce's day.
 History of Virginia
 History of West Virginia

References

External links
 A Guide to the Philip Alexander Bruce Papers 1871-1933
 
 

1856 births
1933 deaths
University of Virginia alumni
Harvard Law School alumni
Historians from Virginia
Historians of Virginia
People from Charlotte County, Virginia
Burials at the University of Virginia Cemetery